Vitula inanimella is a species of snout moth in the genus Vitula. It was described by Harrison Gray Dyar Jr. in 1919. It is found in Mexico and Guatemala.

The wingspan is 20–21 mm. Adults are suffused gray brown with transverse lines faintly indicated by very slightly darker borders.

References

Moths described in 1919
Phycitini